Kamsin: The Untouched is a Hindi drama film directed by Amit Suryavanshi. Film was released in 1997 in the banner of Sai Baba Film. It is the first film of Disha Vakani.

Plot
Disha, a college girl goes for an outing to the countryside with her friends during the college vacation. Problems start when her friends start dying serially.

Cast
 Disha Vakani
 Shiva Rindani

References

External links
 

1990s Hindi-language films
1997 films
Indian erotic horror films